Trochulus suberectus is a species of air-breathing land snail, a pulmonate gastropod mollusk in the family Hygromiidae, the hairy snails and their allies.

References

Hygromiidae
Gastropods described in 1878